Pi in the Sky was an experimental, aerial art display where airplanes spelled out pi to decimal 1,000 places in the sky over the San Francisco Bay Area.  The display took place on September 12, 2012. It was then displayed again in Austin on March 13, 2014, during the SXSW festival, at which time it was said to be the largest art piece ever displayed in the state of Texas.

Description

The aircraft used were 1979 Grumman AA-5B Tigers, small, single-engined planes provided by the company AirSign Aerial Advertising, based in Williston, FL. The numbers were produced by spraying natural, burnt-off canola oil, which dissipated, causing no environmental damage.

The exhibition began in the skies over San Jose, then continued over Fremont, Hayward, Oakland, Berkeley, San Francisco, San Bruno, San Mateo, Redwood City, Palo Alto, and Mountain View. The planes deliberately flew over the headquarters of NASA Ames, Lawrence Livermore National Laboratory, University of California at Berkeley, Stanford University, Google, Facebook, Twitter, and Apple.

The 2012 display was part of the 2012 ZERO1 Biennial, was conceived by artist ISHKY, and involved a company called Stamen Design. ZERO1 is an art-technology network based in San Jose. The display was intended to draw attention to their biennial showcase for art and technology.

The 2014 display was part of an ongoing project, directed by artist ISHKY (Ben Davis), and again involved AirSign Aerial Advertising. The 2014 display quickly gained publicity making it the number 2 top trending hashtag on Twitter during the display and within 24 hours it was shared and viewed a little over six million times.

References

Further reading
John D. Barrow: Pi in the Sky: Counting, Thinking, and Being

External links
 Map showing planned route of aircraft
 ISHKY website
 AirSign website

Mathematical artworks
Art exhibitions in the United States
Art in the San Francisco Bay Area
Contemporary art exhibitions
Pi
2012 in art